Mephisto was a line of chess computers sold by Hegener & Glaser (H+G).  In addition to integrated travel and sensory computers, they also sold a line of modular electronic autosensory boards (Modular, Exclusive, München, and Bavaria) which could accept different program, processor, and display modules.

Its strongest software was written by Richard Lang, who later ported it to personal computers as Psion and ChessGenius. Lang's Mephisto programs won six World Computer Chess Championships (WCCC) from 1984 to 1990. H&G also sold engines licensed from Johan de Koning, Ed Schröder, and Frans Morsch. Different models used different 8-bit, 16-bit and 32-bit processors, including MOS Technology 6502, Motorola 68HC05, Motorola 68000 and others.

Hegener & Glaser and its Mephisto brand were bought in 1994 by Saitek.  Their computers currently sold under the Mephisto brand use programs written by Frans Morsch.

Hegener & Glaser (Mephisto) 

 1969 established in Munich by Manfred Hegener and Florian Glaser for the production of semiconductors
 1978 the programmers Thomas Nitsche and Elmar Henne came into contact with H+G Thomas Nitsche and Elmar Henne
 1980 the "Mephisto" Tradename was created, nicknamed Brikett (German for briquette) — the first German Chess Computer — programmed by Thomas Nietsche and Elmar Henne, appeared in stores.
 1983 Introduction of the Modular system, with the Mobil, Modular, and Exclusive boards and MM I module.
 1984 with Richard Lang and his Psion chess (Winner of World Microcomputer Chess Championship 1984 in Glasgow) began a long series of World Championship successes.
 1985 introduction of Lang's first Mephisto module, the Amsterdam 68000
 1989 over 90% of all chess computers sold in Germany were Mephistos
 1989 H+G buys "Fidelity Electronics Inc." for ~ 7 Million US $
 1990 the market for high-priced chess computers collapses. The cause is the growth of high-performance 486 PCs and the availability of newly developed low-cost strong chess software for PCs.
 1992 H+G shows losses of 28 Million DM
 1992 Ed Schröder wins with Gideon 3.1 (later sold as Mephisto Risc 2) the open 7. WCCC — ahead of large mainframe computers and special hardware machines
 1994 H+G is bought by Saitek for ~ 7 Million DM
 1994 Richard Lang's Genius (Mephisto London) beats Garry Kasparov in the Intel World Chess Grand Prix Turnier in London on a Pentium Processor
 1997 Manfred Hegener and Ossi Weiner form the company "Millennium 2000 GmbH Hegener & Weiner" and produce the "Millennium Schachpartner 2000", sold at 99 DM
 2005 Phoenix Chess Systems releases the Resurrection module for existing Mephisto modular boards.  The hardware uses a 200 MHz ARM processor to run modern chess engines, resulting in the strongest dedicated chess computer ever created.
 2007 Phoenix Chess Systems releases an updated module set, the Resurrection II, with a faster 500 MHz XScale processor.

Mephisto Modular System
Boards:
 Mephisto Mobil (folding magnetic board)
 Mephisto Modular (plastic autosensory board)
 Mephisto Exclusive  (40x40 cm wooden autosensory board)
 Mephisto München  (50x50 cm wooden autosensory board)
 Mephisto Bavaria  (50x50 cm wooden piece recognition board)

Modules:

Mephisto Marco Polo
 Mephisto Almeria 68000
 Mephisto Almeria 68020
 Mephisto Amsterdam
 Mephisto B&P
 Mephisto Dallas 68000
 Mephisto Dallas 68020
 Mephisto Genius 68030
 Mephisto III-S Glasgow
 Mephisto London 68000
 Mephisto London 68020
 Mephisto London 68030
 Mephisto Lyon 68000
 Mephisto Lyon 68020

 Mephisto Magellan
 Mephisto Mirage
 Mephisto MM I
 Mephisto MM II
 Mephisto MM IV
 Mephisto MM V
 Mephisto MM VI
 Mephisto MM VI Schröder - was never distributed
 Mephisto Mystery Modul
 Mephisto PC Modul
 Mephisto Polgar
 Mephisto Polgar 10 MHz Beware: modified Exclusive Board

 Mephisto Portorose 68000
 Mephisto Portorose 68020
 Mephisto Rebell 5.0
 Mephisto Risc 1MB
 Mephisto Risc 2
 Mephisto Roma 68000
 Mephisto Roma 68020
 Mephisto Roma II
 Mephisto Senator
 Mephisto Vancouver 68000
 Mephisto Vancouver 68020

Tournament machines 
Mephisto sold limited edition versions of Lang's championship winning programs in dedicated boards with upgraded processors, cooling, and memory, similar to the hardware used in the championship tournaments.

 Mephisto TM Roma (68020, 25 MHz)
 Mephisto TM Almeria (68020, 30 MHz)
 Mephisto TM Portorose (68030, 36 MHz)
 Mephisto TM Lyon (68030, 36 MHz)
 Mephisto TM Vancouver (68030, 36 MHz)
 Mephisto TM London (68030, 36 MHz)
 Mephisto Wundermaschine (80486, 66 MHz)

Other chess computers from the manufacturer Hegener & Glaser 

 Mephisto Academy
 Mephisto Advanced Travel Chess Computer
 Mephisto Alaska
 Mephisto America
 Mephisto America II
 Mephisto Atlanta
 Mephisto Avanti
 Mephisto Beach
 Mephisto Berlin 68000
 Mephisto Berlin Professional
 Mephisto Bistro
 Mephisto Champion
 Mephisto Chessbook
 Mephisto Chess Challenger
 Mephisto Chess Explorer
 Mephisto Chess Trainer
 Mephisto College
 Mephisto ESB 6000

 Mephisto Europa
 Mephisto Europa A
 Mephisto Excalibur
 Mephisto Excalibur Glasgow
 Mephisto Expert Travel Chess
 Mephisto Explorer Pro
 Mephisto HG 170
 Mephisto HG 240
 Mephisto HG 440
 Mephisto HG 550
 Mephisto I
 Mephisto II
 Mephisto III
 Mephisto Junior (Sensor)
 Mephisto Junior (Tasten)
 Mephisto Junior Master Chess Computer
 Mephisto Madison
 Mephisto Maestro Travel Chess Computer

 Mephisto Manhattan
 Mephisto Marco Polo
 Mephisto Master Chess
 Mephisto Mega IV
 Mein erster Mephisto
 Mephisto Merlin 16K
 Mephisto MeXs
 Mephisto Miami
 Mephisto Micro Travel Chess Computer
 Mephisto Milano
 Mephisto Milano Pro
 Mephisto Mini
 Mephisto Modena
 Mephisto Monaco
 Mephisto Mondial
 Mephisto Mondial II
 Mephisto Mondial 68000XL
 Mephisto Montana

 Mephisto Monte Carlo
 Mephisto Monte Carlo IV
 Mephisto Monte Carlo IV LE
 Mephisto Montreal 68000
 Mephisto Montreux (Johan de Koning)
 Mephisto Mystery
 Mephisto Mythos
 Mephisto Nigel Short
 Mephisto PC Schachbrett (Electronic chess board connected to a PC)
 Mephisto Phantom
 Mephisto Schachakademie
 Mephisto Schachschule
 Mephisto Schachschule II
 Mephisto Super Mondial
 Mephisto Super Mondial II
 Mephisto Supermini
 Mephisto Talking Chess Trainer
 Mephisto Talking Chess Academy
 Mephisto Travel Chess
 Russian made chess computer ″ШК-1″ (ShK-1 for ″shakhmatniy kompyuter″ – Chess Computer) using "Mephisto H&G OEM chip"

See also 
 ChessGenius
 Saitek
 Computer chess
 Mephisto (automaton)

References

External links 

 Mephisto page on saitek site 
 Collection of chess computers
 Mephisto on computer-chess wiki (German)
 Collection of chess computers, Valencia,(Spanish)

Computer chess
Chess computers
Defunct video game companies of Germany